Bamum is a Unicode block containing the characters of stage-G Bamum script, used for modern writing of the Bamum language of western Cameroon. Characters for writing earlier orthographies (stages A–F) are contained in a Bamum Supplement block.

History
The following Unicode-related documents record the purpose and process of defining specific characters in the Bamum block:

References 

Unicode blocks